Minuscule 256 (in the Gregory-Aland numbering), α216 (Soden), is a Greek-Armenian minuscule manuscript of the New Testament, on parchment. Palaeographically it has been assigned to the 11th century.
It was adapted for liturgical use.

Formerly it was assigned by 301a, 259p, and 102r.

Description 

The codex contains the text of the Acts of the Apostles, Catholic epistles, Pauline epistles, and Book of Revelation, on 323 parchment leaves, with lacunae. The text is written in two columns per page, 36 lines per page.

Text 

The Greek text of the codex is a representative of the Alexandrian text-type in Pauline epistles, and the Byzantine elsewhere.

The ending of the Epistle to the Romans has an unusual order of verses: 16:23; 16:25-27; 16:24 (as in codices P 33 104 263 365 436 459 1319 1573 1837 1852 syrp arm).

History 

The manuscript once belonged to Archbishop of Tarsus (1153-1198). It was examined and described by Paulin Martin. The manuscript was collated by C. F. Matthaei and Herman C. Hoskier (only Apocalypse).

Gregory saw it in 1885. Formerly it was assigned by 301a, 259p, and 102r. In 1908 Gregory gave the number 256 to it.

The manuscript is currently housed at the Bibliothèque nationale de France (Armen. 27 (9)) at Paris.

See also 

 List of New Testament minuscules
 Biblical manuscript
 Textual criticism

References

Further reading 

 Christian Frederick Matthaei, Novum Testamentum Graece et Latine (Riga, 1782-1788). (as 13 and 14)
 Herman C. Hoskier, Concerning the Text of the Apocalypse (London, 1929), vol. 1, pp. 347–352.

External links 
Online images of Minuscule 256 (Digital Microfilm) at the National Library of France.

Greek New Testament minuscules
11th-century biblical manuscripts